The , also sometimes called the Yumenoshima Tropical Plant Dome, is a botanical garden located at 3-2, Yumenoshima, Kōtō, Tokyo, Japan. It is operated by the Tokyo Metropolitan Park Association and open daily except Mondays; an admission fee is charged.

The greenhouse was established in 1988 in Yumenoshima ("Dream Island") Park, a reclaimed landfill and dumping ground in Tokyo Bay. Its three domes, A, B, and C, currently contain about 1,000 species of tropical and semitropical plants. A Dome features a rainforest habitat with ferns and waterfall, B Dome represents a tropical village, and C Dome contains vegetation of the Ogasawara Islands. There is also a small carnivorous plant room.

Plants collection 

The domes' plant collections include palms, orchids, aquatic plants, Pandanus, Hevea brasiliensis, Samanea saman, Barringtonia racemosa, Satakentia liukiuensis, Cyathea lepifera, C. mertensiana, C. spinulosa, and Dicksonia antarctica.

See also 
 List of botanical gardens in Japan

References

External links
 Yumenoshima Tropical Greenhouse Dome (Japanese)
 Accessible Tokyo description
 Japan Visitor blog
 BGCI entry

Botanical gardens in Japan
Gardens in Tokyo
Greenhouses in Japan
Buildings and structures in Koto, Tokyo